Hope Hall Foundation School is a senior secondary school affiliated to Central Board of Secondary Education (CBSE) in New Delhi's  RK Puram district. It was founded in 1990 by Amir Chand Maheshwari, a New Delhi based industrialist.

History 
Hope Hall Foundation School was founded in 1990 by Mr. Amir Chand Maheshwari, a prominent industrialist based in New Delhi.

The school initially began as a single storey building with approximately 80 students and 15 staff members. A single school bus served the local area and one laboratory served the entire school.

Campus and facilities 
The school campus is an area housing a new Yellow/Red building. Currently, the school grounds have sports facilities for basketball, volleyball, soccer and badminton & cricket nets.

The school building circumferences a brown swamp.

Laboratories are present for each of the sciences, for mathematics, for the languages and for social science. In addition, the school has two computer laboratories, one each for the Junior and Senior students.

The school also has a handicrafts room, used for training in needle-craft, bead-work and dyeing; a dance-room, used as a venue for training in traditional dances under a professional teacher; a music room, used to coach students in vocal and instrumental music, and a yoga room, where students are taught to meditate, relax and rejuvenate.

A library, the only good part of this school, is also available for the students. 

Finally, a clinic, under the supervision of a trained nurse, caters to emergency medical needs that arise in the school. The school also claims to have a doctor on call.

Curriculum 
Hope Hall Foundation School prepares students for the All India Secondary School Examination (Class X) and the All India Senior School Certificate Examination (Class XII) conducted by the Central Board of Secondary Education (CBSE), Delhi. The school offers study in the streams of Science, commerce and Humanities. 

The medium of instruction is English. Hindi is taught as a second language to classes I - VIII. As a third language the students of classes IX-X can opt for Sanskrit or French. The students of classes IX and X can opt for either Hindi, Sanskrit or French as a Second language.

Educational institutions established in 1990
Schools in Delhi
1990 establishments in Delhi